The 2014–15 season is the 24th edition of Europe's premier basketball tournament for women - EuroLeague Women since it was rebranded to its current format.

Group stage

Group B

Quarterfinals

Final four

Semifinal

Third-place game

References

External links
  FIBA Europe website
  EuroLeague Women official website

Fenerbahçe Basketball